The Yorkton Regiment was an infantry regiment of the Non-Permanent Active Militia of the Canadian Militia (now the Canadian Army). It was formed in 1924, when The North Saskatchewan Regiment (1920–1924) was reorganized into four separate regiments, and was located in Yorkton, Saskatchewan. In 1936, the regiment was converted from infantry to artillery and currently exists today as the 64th Field Battery, RCA.

History 
Organized on 15 May 1924, after the reorganization of The North Saskatchewan Regiment (1920–1924) into four separate regiments: The Saskatoon Regiment, The Prince Albert Volunteers, The Battleford Light Infantry and The Yorkton Regiment.

Reportedly its Regimental Headquarters and A Company was at Yorkton, Saskatchewan; its B Company at Melville, Saskatchewan; its  C Company at Kamsack, Saskatchewan; and its D Company at Buchanan, Saskatchewan.

The regiment perpetuated the 188th (Saskatchewan) Battalion, CEF.

Disbandment and conversion 
During the 1936 Canadian Militia reorganization, on 14 December 1936, The Yorkton Regiment was converted from infantry to artillery and was redesignated as the 64th (Yorkton) Field Battery, RCA (now the 64th Field Battery, RCA).

Alliances 
From 1924–1936, The Yorkton Regiment was allied to The Duke of Wellington's Regiment (West Riding).

Battle honours 

The regiment was award the following battle honours in 1930.
 Arras, 1917, '18
 Hill 70
 Ypres, 1917
 Amiens
 Hindenburg Line
 Pursuit to Mons

References 

Infantry regiments of Canada
Military units and formations established in 1924
Military units and formations disestablished in 1936
Military units and formations of Saskatchewan